Ancylolomia obstitella,  the Opaque grass-moth is a moth in the family Crambidae. It was described by Charles Swinhoe in 1886. It is found in India.

References

Ancylolomia
Moths described in 1886
Moths of Asia